Christianity is a minority in Guizhou province of China. Gha-Mu and A-Hmao are ethnic groups with large share of Christians.   The Roman Catholic Archdiocese of Guiyang and the Roman Catholic Diocese of Nanlong have their seats in the province. Sam Pollard was a missionary of China Inland Mission, who was active among the A-Hmao. 
When the new government took power in 1949, Guizhou may have had about 40,000 Protestants.  The current Protestant population is at about half a million.  Christianity in Dafang and Christianity in Weining, which both mainly consist of Protestants, exceed 100,000. 
 They both are part of Christianity in Bijie. 
Persecution of Christians occurs in Guizhou.

See also 
 Agatha Lin – Catholic martyr saint from Guizhou
 Agnes Tsao Kou Ying – Catholic martyr saint from Guizhou
 Lucy Yi Zhenmei – Sichuanese Catholic missionary in Guizhou, martyr saint
 Sam Pollard (missionary)
 Christianity in Guizhou's neighbouring provinces
 Christianity in Hunan
 Christianity in Sichuan

References